Slovakia competed at the 2010 Winter Olympics in Vancouver, British Columbia, Canada. Slovak athletes earned their first gold medal ever in the Winter Olympics with Anastasiya Kuzmina's gold in the women's biathlon sprint event.

Medalists

Alpine skiing

Men

Women

Biathlon

Men

Men's relay

Women

Women's relay

Bobsleigh

Two-man

Four-man

Cross-country skiing

Men

Women
Alena Procházková participated only for one event due to inflammation of the trachea.

Figure skating

Ice hockey

Men's tournament

Roster

Group play
Slovakia played in Group B.
Round-robin
All times are local (UTC-8).

Standings

Final rounds
Qualification playoff

Quarterfinal

Semifinal

Bronze medal game

Women's tournament

Roster

Group play
Slovakia played in Group A.
Round-robin
All times are local (UTC-8).

Standings

Classification rounds
Fifth place semifinal

Seventh place game

Luge

Women's singles

Men's singles

Doubles

Ski jumping

Men

References

2010 in Slovak sport
Nations at the 2010 Winter Olympics
2010